Genevieve Blinn (born Genevieve Clothilde Nannery; June 12, 1874 – July 20, 1956) was a Canadian actress who appeared on stage and in Hollywood silent motion pictures. She was a native of New Brunswick, Canada.

Family
Genevieve Nannery was the last member of an old theater family from Saint John, New Brunswick. Her brother Ed Nannary was a stage actor in New York City and on the west coast. Her sister May performed as a star of the old Alcatraz Theater in San Francisco, California.

Stage career
In October 1906 Blinn was the leading woman in the Ezra Kendall production of Swell, Elegant Jones. A comedy in three acts, the play was staged at the Wilmington, Delaware, Opera House. Brinn acted in stage roles opposite Richard Mansfield, Robert Mantel, and Willard Mack.

Blinn came to Los Angeles, California, in February 1912 as the leading lady of the Burbank Stock Company. Her arrival was in the press after she established a name for herself in eastern theatrical engagements. In New York she appeared at the head of the Crescent Stock Company for the previous five months. Her first performance with Burbank came as "Ann Brown" in a farce called Seven Days. The primary comedy figure, Blinn played a woman who believed in theosophy.

Silent films
Blinn's career as a performer in movies began with a role as "Countess de Moray" in A Wife's Sacrifice (1916). She is best known for her role as the Bath-Sheba in The Queen of Sheba (1921). Aside from this feature, she was in a number of other films which starred Theda Bara.

Blinn retired from the stage and screen with the advent of sound  motion pictures. Her last film was Common Clay (1930), in which she played the role of "Mrs. Fullerton."

Personal life
On June 4, 1895, Genevieve Nannery married lumberman Irving L. Blinn from Los Angeles, California. She petitioned for a divorce from her husband in July 1904.

Blinn died in 1956 in San Rafael, California, following a long illness. A son, William Lewis Blinn, predeceased his mother. He was a member of the Olympic Club and a graduate of the University of Santa Clara.

Partial filmography

References

Lima, Ohio News, Genevieve Blinn, Ex-Star, Dies, July 22, 1956, Page 9B.
Los Angeles Times, The Public Service, July 16, 1904, Page A2.
Los Angeles Times, Leading Lady Is Due Today, February 29, 1912, Page III4.
New York Times, Ezra Kendall Produces A New Play, October 5, 1906, Page 9.
William Nannery and Atlantic Victorian Theatre: The Amateur Legacy by Carl Killen, M. A. Thesis (PDF - large file)

External links

Canadian silent film actresses
Canadian stage actresses
1874 births
1956 deaths
Actresses from New Brunswick
20th-century Canadian actresses
Canadian film actresses
Canadian expatriate actresses in the United States